KDDV-FM (101.5 FM) is a radio station licensed to Wright, Wyoming, United States. It airs a classic rock music format. The station is currently owned by Legend Communications of Wyoming, LLC.

KDDV-FM and its three sister stations, KIML, KAML-FM, and KGWY, are located at 2810 Southern Drive, Gillette. KAML-FM and KDDV-FM share a transmitter site south of Gillette, on a tower that is the tallest man-made structure in the state.

Previous logo
 (KDDV's logo under previous classic hits format)

References

External links

DDV-FM
Classic rock radio stations in the United States
Radio stations established in 1964
1964 establishments in Wyoming